Fannie Jacobs (November 1, 1885—July 6, 1977), also known as Cele Berney, was an American women's rights and organized labor activist who ran unsuccessfully for the New York State Assembly in 1918 and 1919.

Fannie was a nickname and Jacobs was her married name.

Early life
Jacobs was born in Russia on November 1, 1885.  In 1891, when she was four or five, her family immigrated to the United States, settling in Brooklyn, New York.

Jacobs spoke Yiddish along with English.

1918 and 1919 Run for New York State Assembly
In 1918, Fannie ran as a Socialist Party of America candidate for the Assembly. During her campaign, she gave the speech "Women-Past, Present, and Future" to an overflow crowd.  Jacobs was defeated.

In 1919, Jacobs ran for office again under the Communist Labor Party of America. When election officials first counted the results, she was the winner. But during the recount, she lost.

On December 9, 1919, at a Communist Labor Party meeting in Brooklyn, Jacobs gave a speech in which she advocated for the rights of the working class.  She denounced capitalists' interventions against political organizing among workers, saying that "if ever you try to change the conditions under which you live, so that it is in the interest of the working class, you will find that American capitalist dictatorship more brutal than that of Czarist Russia".

Later life and death
In later life, Fannie called herself Cele Berney. Jacobs died on July 6, 1977 in Miami, Florida.

Personal life
In 1902, she married Ralph M. Jacobs. They had three children:

Arthur S. Jacobs (b. 1903)
Lillian Jacobs (b. 1906), who married a Mr. Levitch
Theodore Jacobs (b. 1911)

References

1885 births
1977 deaths
American women's rights activists
Emigrants from the Russian Empire to the United States
New York (state) socialists
People from Brooklyn
American political candidates
20th-century American politicians
20th-century American women politicians